The 2003 EHF Women's Cup Winners' Cup was the twenty-seventh edition of EHF's competition for women's handball national cup champions. It ran from January 4 to May 18, 2003.

ES Besançon became the first French team to win the Cup Winners' Cup, overcoming an away loss by a 2-goals margin in the final against Spartak Kyiv. 
As of 2013 it is the only post-Soviet appearance in an EHF final of Spartak, which remains the most successful team in European women's handball with 13 European Cups.

Results

References

Women's EHF Cup Winners' Cup
2002 in handball
2003 in handball